This is a list of frigate classes of the Hellenic Navy.

Notes and references 

Greece
Greece